Guerrilla warfare is a form of irregular warfare in which small groups of combatants, such as paramilitary personnel, armed civilians, or irregulars, use military tactics including ambushes, sabotage, raids, petty warfare, hit-and-run tactics, and mobility, to fight a larger and less-mobile traditional military.

Although the term "guerrilla warfare" was coined in the context of the Peninsular War in the 19th century, the tactical methods of guerrilla warfare have long been in use. In the 6th century BC, Sun Tzu proposed the use of guerrilla-style tactics in The Art of War. The 3rd century BC Roman general Quintus Fabius Maximus Verrucosus is also credited with inventing many of the tactics of guerrilla warfare through what is today called the Fabian strategy. Guerrilla warfare has been used by various factions throughout history and is particularly associated with revolutionary movements and popular resistance against invading or occupying armies.

Guerrilla tactics focus on avoiding head-on confrontations with enemy armies, typically due to inferior arms or forces, and instead engage in limited skirmishes with the goal of exhausting adversaries and forcing them to withdraw. Due to this, guerrilla tactics are rarely used for anything other than defence. Organized guerrilla groups often depend on the support of either the local population or foreign backers who sympathize with the guerrilla group's efforts.

Etymology 

The term became popular during the early-19th century Peninsular War, when, after the defeat of their regular armies, the Spanish and Portuguese people successfully rose against the Napoleonic troops and defeated a highly superior army using the guerrilla strategy.

The term guerrilla was used in English as early as 1809 to refer to the individual fighters (e.g., "The town was taken by the guerrillas"), and also (as in Spanish) to denote a group or band of such fighters. However, in most languages guerrilla still denotes the specific style of warfare. The use of the diminutive evokes the differences in number, scale, and scope between the guerrilla army and the formal, professional army of the state.

History

Prehistoric tribal warriors presumably employed guerrilla-style tactics against enemy tribes. Evidence of conventional warfare, on the other hand, did not emerge until 3100 BC in Egypt and Mesopotamia.
The Chinese general and strategist Sun Tzu, in his The Art of War (6th century BC), became one of the earliest to propose the use of guerrilla warfare. This inspired developments in modern guerrilla warfare. 

In the 3rd century BC, Quintus Fabius Maximus Verrucosus, widely regarded as the "father of guerrilla warfare", devised the Fabian strategy, which the Roman Republic used to great effect against Hannibal's army. This strategy would influence guerrilla tactics into the modern era.

In the medieval Roman Empire, guerrilla warfare was frequently practiced between the eighth through tenth centuries along the eastern frontier with the Umayyad and then Abbasid caliphates. Tactics involved a heavy emphasis on reconnaissance and intelligence, shadowing the enemy, evacuating threatened population centres, and attacking when the enemy dispersed to raid. In the later tenth century this form of warfare was codified in a military manual known by its later Latin name as De velitatione bellica ('On Skirmishing') so it would not be forgotten in the future.

Since the Enlightenment, ideologies such as nationalism, liberalism, socialism, and religious fundamentalism have played an important role in shaping insurgencies and guerrilla warfare.

In the 17th century, Chhatrapati Shivaji Maharaj, founder of the Maratha Empire, pioneered Shiva sutra or Ganimi Kava (Guerrilla Tactics) to defeat the many times larger and more powerful armies of the Mughal Empire.

Kerala Varma (Pazhassi Raja) (1753-1805) used guerrilla techniques in his war against the British East India Company in India between 1790 and 1805. 
Arthur Wellesley adopted the term "guerrilla" into  English from Spanish usage in 1809, after the Pazhassi revolt against the British. Arthur Wellesley (in India 1797-1805) had commanded forces assigned to defeat Pazhassi's techniques, but failed.

The Moroccan military leader Abd el-Krim ( - 1963) and his father unified the Moroccan tribes under their control and took up arms against the Spanish and French occupiers during the Rif War in 1920. For the first time in history, tunnel warfare was used alongside modern guerrilla tactics, which caused considerable damage to both the colonial armies in Morocco. 

In the early 20th century Michael Collins and Tom Barry both developed many tactical features of guerrilla warfare during the guerrilla phase of the 1919-1921 Irish War of Independence. Collins developed mainly urban guerrilla-warfare tactics in  Dublin city (the Irish capital). Operations in which small  Irish Republican Army (IRA) units (3 to 6 guerrillas) quickly attacked a target and then disappeared into civilian crowds frustrated the British enemy. The best example of this occurred on  Bloody Sunday (21 November 1920), when Collins's assassination unit, known as  "The Squad", wiped out a group of British intelligence agents ("the Cairo Gang") early in the morning (14 were killed, six were wounded) - some regular officers were also killed in the purge. That afternoon, a Royal Irish Constabulary force consisting of both regular RIC personnel and the Auxiliary Division took revenge, shooting into a crowd at a football match in Croke Park, killing fourteen civilians and injuring 60 others.

In west County Cork, Tom Barry was the commander of the IRA  West Cork brigade. Fighting in west Cork was rural, and the IRA fought in much larger units than their fellows in urban areas. These units, called "flying columns", engaged British forces in large battles, usually for between 10 - 30 minutes. The Kilmichael Ambush in November 1920 and the Crossbarry Ambush in March 1921 are the most famous examples of Barry's flying columns causing large casualties to enemy forces.

The Algerian Revolution of 1954 started with a handful of Algerian guerrillas. Primitively armed, the guerrillas fought the French for over eight years. This remains a prototype for modern insurgency and counterinsurgency, terrorism, torture, and asymmetric warfare prevalent throughout the world today. In South Africa, African National Congress (ANC) members studied the Algerian War, prior to the release and apotheosis of Nelson Mandela; in their intifada against Israel, Palestinian fighters have sought to emulate it. Additionally, the tactics of Al-Qaeda closely resemble those of the Algerians.

The Mukti Bahini (Bengali: মুক্তিবাহিনী, translates as 'freedom fighters', or liberation army), also known as the Bangladesh Forces, was the guerrilla resistance movement consisting of the Bangladeshi military, paramilitary and civilians during the Bangladesh Liberation War that transformed East Pakistan into Bangladesh in 1971. An earlier name Mukti Fauj was also used.

Strategy, tactics and methods

Strategy 

Guerrilla warfare is a type of asymmetric warfare: competition between opponents of unequal strength. It is also a type of irregular warfare: that is, it aims not simply to defeat an invading enemy, but to win popular support and political influence, to the enemy's cost. Accordingly, guerrilla strategy aims to magnify the impact of a small, mobile force on a larger, more-cumbersome one. If successful, guerrillas weaken their enemy by attrition, eventually forcing them to withdraw.

Tactics 
Tactically, guerrillas usually avoid confrontation with large units and formations of enemy troops but seek and attack small groups of enemy personnel and resources to gradually deplete the opposing force while minimizing their own losses. The guerrilla prizes mobility, secrecy, and surprise, organizing in small units and taking advantage of terrain that is difficult for larger units to use. For example, Mao Zedong summarized basic guerrilla tactics at the beginning of the Chinese Civil War as:"The enemy advances, we retreat; the enemy camps, we harass; the enemy tires, we attack; the enemy retreats, we pursue." At least one author credits the ancient Chinese work The Art of War with inspiring Mao's tactics. In the 20th century, other communist leaders, including North Vietnamese Ho Chi Minh, often used and developed guerrilla warfare tactics, which provided a model for their use elsewhere, leading to the Cuban "foco" theory and the anti-Soviet Mujahadeen in Afghanistan.

Unconventional methods 
In addition to traditional military methods, guerrilla groups may rely also on destroying infrastructure, using improvised explosive devices, for example. They typically also rely on logistical and political support from the local population and foreign backers, are often embedded within it (thereby using the population as a human shield), and many guerrilla groups are adept at public persuasion through propaganda and use of force.
The opposing army may come to suspect all civilians as potential guerrilla backers.
Many guerrilla movements today also rely heavily on children as combatants, scouts, porters, spies, informants, and in other roles. It has drawn international condemnation. Many states also recruit children into their armed forces.

Some guerrilla groups also use refugees as weapons to solidify power or politically destabilize an adversary. The Colombian armed conflict displaced millions of Colombians, and so did the tribal guerrilla warfare (against Soviets) in Afghanistan. The civilian population living in the area might be suspected of having collaborated with the enemy and find itself displaced, as the guerrillas fight for territory.

Growth during the 20th century 
The growth of guerrilla warfare in the 20th century was inspired in part by theoretical works on guerrilla warfare, starting with the Manual de Guerra de Guerrillas by Matías Ramón Mella written in the 19th century and, more recently, Mao Zedong's On Guerrilla Warfare, Che Guevara's Guerrilla Warfare , and Lenin's text of the same name, all written after the successful revolutions carried by them in China, Cuba and Russia, respectively. Those texts characterized the tactic of guerrilla warfare as, according to Che Guevara's text, being "used by the side which is supported by a majority but which possesses a much smaller number of arms for use in defense against oppression".

Foco theory 

In the 1960s, the Marxist revolutionary Che Guevara developed the foco theory of revolution in his book Guerrilla Warfare, based on his experiences during the 1959 Cuban Revolution. This theory was later formalised as "focal-ism" by Régis Debray. Its central principle is that vanguardism by cadres of small, fast-moving paramilitary groups can provide a focus for popular discontent against a sitting regime, and thereby lead a general insurrection. Although the original approach was to mobilize and launch attacks from rural areas, many foco ideas were adapted into urban guerrilla warfare movements.

Comparison of guerrilla warfare and terrorism 
There is no commonly accepted definition of "terrorism", and the term is frequently used as political propaganda by belligerents (most often by governments in power) to denounce opponents whose status as terrorists is disputed.

Contrary to some terrorist groups, guerrillas usually work in open positions as armed units, try to hold and seize land, do not refrain from fighting enemy military force in battle and usually apply pressure to control or dominate territory and population, or deny that control to the enemy. While the primary concern of guerrillas is the enemy's active military units, terrorists largely are concerned with non-military agents and target mostly civilians. Guerrilla forces principally fight in accordance with the law of war (jus in bello). In this sense, they respect the rights of innocent civilians by refraining from targeting them.

See also

 Conventional warfare
 Irregular military
 Counter-insurgency
 Fabian strategy
 Free War
 Freedom Fighters (disambiguation)
 History of guerrilla warfare
 "Yank" Levy
 List of guerrilla movements
 List of guerrillas
 List of revolutions and rebellions
 Militia
 New generation warfare
 Partisan (military)
 Paramilitary
 Resistance during World War II
 Special forces
 Unconventional warfare
 Terrorism 
 Violent non-state actor
 Viet Cong
 Improvised explosive device
 TM 31-210 Improvised Munitions Handbook

References

Further reading
 Asprey, Robert. War in the Shadows: The Guerrilla in History
  
 Derradji Abder-Rahmane, The Algerian Guerrilla Campaign Strategy & Tactics, Lewiston, New York: Edwin Mellen Press, 1997.
 Hinckle, Warren (with Steven Chain and David Goldstein): Guerrilla-Krieg in USA (Guerrilla war in the USA), Stuttgart (Deutsche Verlagsanstalt) 1971. 
 Keats, John (1990). They Fought Alone. Time Life. 
 MacDonald, Peter. Giap: The Victor in Vietnam
 
 Oller, John. The Swamp Fox: How Francis Marion Saved the American Revolution. Boston: Da Capo Press, 2016. .
 Peers, William R.; Brelis, Dean. Behind the Burma Road: The Story of America's Most Successful Guerrilla Force. Boston: Little, Brown & Co., 1963.
 Polack, Peter. Guerrilla Warfare; Kings of Revolution Casemate,.
 Thomas Powers, "The War without End" (review of Steve Coll, Directorate S: The CIA and America's Secret Wars in Afghanistan and Pakistan, Penguin, 2018, 757 pp.), The New York Review of Books, vol. LXV, no. 7 (19 April 2018), pp. 42–43. "Forty-plus years after our failure in Vietnam, the United States is again fighting an endless war in a faraway place against a culture and a people we don't understand for political reasons that make sense in Washington, but nowhere else." (p. 43.)
 Schmidt, LS. 1982. "American Involvement in the Filipino Resistance on Mindanao During the Japanese Occupation, 1942-1945" . M.S. Thesis. U.S. Army Command and General Staff College. 274 pp.
 Sutherland, Daniel E. "Sideshow No Longer: A Historiographical Review of the Guerrilla War." Civil War History 46.1 (2000): 5-23; American Civil War, 1861–65
 Sutherland, Daniel E. A Savage Conflict: The Decisive Role of Guerrillas in the American Civil War (U of North Carolina Press, 2009). online
 Weber, Olivier, Afghan Eternity, 2002

External links

  – Pakistani militants conduct raids in Iran
 abcNEWS Exclusive: The Secret War – Deadly guerrilla raids in Iran
 Insurgency Research Group – Multi-expert blog dedicated to the study of insurgency and the development of counter-insurgency policy.
 Guerrilla warfare on Spartacus Educational
 Encyclopædia Britannica, Guerrilla warfare
 Relearning Counterinsurgency Warfare
 Casebook on Insurgency and Revolutionary Warfare United States Army Special Operations Command
 Counter Insurgency Jungle Warfare School (CIJWS)India

 
Warfare by type
Spanish words and phrases